Kish Kash is the third studio album by English electronic music duo Basement Jaxx, released on 20 October 2003 by XL and Astralwerks. After a lengthy tour which caused them exhaustion and homesickness, they settled in their new studio and wanted to develop a new fresh approach with less reliant on grooves and samples and more focused on songwriting.

It reached number 17 on the UK Albums Chart. It later won the Grammy Award for Best Dance/Electronic Album the first time it was awarded in 2005. The album was nominated for the Mercury Prize in 2004. Three singles were released from the album: "Lucky Star", "Good Luck" and "Plug It In".

Background and development

Returning from their 2001 world tour to promote Rooty with exhaustion and homesickness, Felix and Simon settled into their new Brixton studio. On 23 September 2002, they released second extended play Junction, which included four new songs and was named after Loughborough Junction, the place of the duo's original parties. They also remixed Missy Elliott, DJ Sneak and Justin Timberlake while still deciding where to go next.

The recording process took place between March 2002 and August 2003. According to Buxton, the duo undertook the recording of Kish Kash in "a sober state of mind". While making the album, they both stayed away from clubs, preferring to ignore the latest fads in dance culture, wanting to develop a fresh approach, less reliant on grooves and samples and more focused on songwriting, often starting with just a voice and guitar. "We kind of went back to school," says Buxton. "We got this new studio and had to learn how to use it." Adds Ratcliffe: "There was a greater sense that we didn't know what we were doing but it was more enjoyable than before."

Buxton also revealed that they were going to name the album Rhapsody, but his father thought it was "too square" and commented: "It would be okay if [the album] was a rap record about sodomy, but it’s not." Someone else then said the title was "like a box of chocolates or a Gareth Gates album", so they changed it to Kish Kash before the artwork went to print. The new name was a phrase for money used by one of their friends.

The album was also their last recording with record label Astralwerks, as they announced backstage of the 47th Annual Grammy Awards.

Content

The album opens with "Good Luck", with vocals contributed by Lisa Kekaula, a member from the American rock and roll group The Bellrays. Despite her musical style being different than the duo's. the duo decided to collaborate with The London Session Orchestra. "I've wanted to make a beautiful song. But I was suffering a lot on how to express it." At that time, their manager suggested them to use an orchestra. "The recording sessions were participated by 16 people. It was really spectacular. That is making real music!," he claimed.

"Benjilude" features vocals from Joe Benjamin, a 70-year-old Bermudan man that walks around Brixton with "a Stetson hat, a large stick and a kind of poncho." Buxton befriended him when the man used to live there, then he invited him to studio. "We like interludes; used sparingly and wisely, they help to blend things," said Ratcliffe.

Meshell Ndegeocello was touring in the UK when she worked with the duo for "Right Here's the Spot" and "Feels Like Home". But on the second day, she felt ill and they had to make her a bed in the vocal booth. She told PrideSource about her experience working with the duo: "It was good. I had a great time and I enjoyed it very much. It was nice to work with different people. I always enjoy the experience of making music with people". On the making of "Right Here's the Spot", she stated: "I go out (to night clubs) myself and I love that particular genre of music. It was fun." In 2015, she recalled the sessions with the duo, she stated that they "definitely taught [her] about sonics and sound, and also just the method of singing a lot and letting someone sift through it all and find the phrases which they like."

The collaboration between the duo and Phoebe Killdeer came as a suggestion from their record label, as Astralwerks also wanted Killdeer to study the two, despite the fact that she was a singer then herself. Killdeer recorded her part in three hours on an afternoon for the track "Tonight". She shared: "[It was] fun to work with them. We complemented each other well."

The album's second track, "Right Here's the Spot", is a collaboration with Meshell Ndegeocello. Michaelangelo Matos from The Village Voice, called it "Ndegeocello's Prince-tribute collaboration with Basement Jaxx." "Cish Cash", featuring the voice of Siouxsie Sioux, is a punk-influenced track. The album's concluding track, "Feels Like Home", was claimed by Excalim.cas Martin Turenne as "the gloomiest track in Jaxx history" with "a beatless dirge in which grinding electronics buzz" under Meshell Ndegeocello's "mournful" singing. Ernest Hardy from LA Weekly called the song a "dreamy, atmospheric closing number".

The lyrical theme of "Supersonic" is "outer space".

 Musical style 

Basement Jaxx had previously been inspired by their peers in the dance music scene, but by the time of recording Kish Kash this had changed. "We were listening to what other people were doing and realizing it was all pretty stagnant and uninspiring," says Simon. "There was nothing to look up to in a way. We had to do something new." Around this time, the duo listened to artists that had "a less direct influence" on the record including Radiohead, the Neptunes, Timbaland and System of a Down.

Instead of being influenced by artists they had been in the past, like Prince and Todd Terry, the duo were more influenced by Brian Eno on their third album. "If anything, the new album is more classic in feel, more song-based", Ratcliffe explains to Billboard. "It's more traditional in that respect. It's also a bit more intelligent, which is a very dangerous word to use."

Mark Pytlik from Pitchfork summed up the album's musical genres: "Containing fused-together fragments of disco, electro, acid, bollywood, new wave, and whatever the hell the incredible 'Living Room' is, Kish Kash'''s gaudy world collage fell by the wayside next to the minimalist sounds of microhouse and grime."

 Singles 

The first single released from the album was "Lucky Star" in November 2003. It reached number 23 in the UK charts. The single marked Basement Jaxx's return after a two-year break. The single featured Mercury Music Prize-winning artist Dizzee Rascal and British Bhangra vocalist Mona Singh on the chorus.

"Good Luck" was released in January 2004 and debuted at number 12 in the UK. The lead vocals were sung by Lisa Kekaula, lead singer of US band The Bellrays. "Good Luck" was re-released in July, due to exposure on the BBC coverage of the Euro 2004 television campaign. It reached number 14 that time around.

"Plug It In", the third and final single from the album, was released on 4 April 2004 and debuted at number 22. It featured 'N Sync member JC Chasez (credited as 'J.C. Chasez').

A music video which didn't feature Siouxsie Sioux was also made for "Cish Cash", though it was not released as a single.

Critical reception

Despite being very pleased with the album, the duo expected a critical backlash for its star turns and darker sound. Review aggregator website Metacritic gave the album a score of 85 out of 100, signifying "universal acclaim". "We thought we’d get a kicking", says Buxton, "but it’s gone down well."

Scott Plagenhoef of Pitchfork gave Kish Kash a score of 9.1/10, calling the album "the most propulsive, ferocious music of the year as well as some of the most poignant." David Browne of Entertainment Weekly called it "the richest and most fervent music the Jaxx have ever made". John Davidson of PopMatters called it "their best sustained effort so far." Andy Battaglia of The A.V. Club called it "an album that sets the bar for density and imagination almost unreasonably high." Blender praised the album as "their most violently inventive album yet", while Uncut described it as "a truly exhilarating 50 minutes of music."

Stephen Dalton of NME, on the other hand, called Kish Kash "a naggingly problematic record" with "a void at its heart that no amount of cool celebrity mates can conceal." Dave Simpson of The Guardian was critical of the album's "recurring sense of enforced jollity" and "lame attempts at introspection", but concluded that "anyone left standing on pop's dancefloor will certainly lap this up". AllMusic's John Bush, whilst giving it a very positive review and calling it perhaps the best dance record of 2003, wrote that Kish Kash was "the least imaginative record Basement Jaxx have ever released." Robert Christgau of The Village Voice was more reserved in his praise, giving the album a three-star honorable mention rating and remarking: "Is that blood the big-time vocalists smear on the tracks, or ichor?"Complex called the album their last "great project", seeing as their subsequent albums failed to make a mark with critics or the Grammy board.

Ella Eyre said the album was the first she ever bought "because [she] kept stealing [her] mum's and [her mother] hid it from [her]." She also cited Basement Jaxx as one of her musical influences.

AccoladesKish Kash was included in several year-end lists, including Spin at number 38. It was voted the eighth best album of 2003 in the Pazz & Jop, an annual poll of American critics nationwide, published by The Village Voice.Vices electronic music website Trump ranked the album on their list of "99 Greatest Dance Albums of All Time" at number 36, calling it a "repulsive menu of flatulent electronic overload", while at PopMatters, the album was listed on their "100 Best Albums of the 2000s" list at number 18. Pitchfork ranked Kish Kash and Rooty at 66 and 65, respectively, in its list of the 100 top albums from 2000 to 2004.

While predicting winners of the 47th Annual Grammy Awards' categories, Sal Cinquemani and Paul Henderson from Slant Six Magazine predicted the song's win, with Cinquemani jokingly said: "Do they really need to make room for Kish Kash? I would have thought it was a glock." Their prediction came true as Basement Jaxx became the first ever to win this category. According to Billboard'', their win was greeted with "universal applause."

Track listing

Credits and personnel 

Basement Jaxx
 Felix Buxton – mixing, production
 Simon Ratcliffe

Additional personnel
 Allonymous – vocals
 Natasha Awuku – background vocals
 Basil – percussion
 Joe Benjamin – vocals 
 JC Chasez – vocals
 Cherokee – backing vocals
 Nathan "Tugg" Curran – drums
 Dizzee Rascal – vocals
 Sharlene Hector – choral vocals, backing vocals
 Cotlyn Jackson – vocals
 Totlyn Jackson – vocals
 Simeon Jones – harmonica
 Lisa Kekaula – vocals
 Francine Kufonji – backing vocals
 Kele Le Roc – backing vocals
 Phil Lee – assistance
 Xenia Lewis – vocals
 The London Session Orchestra – strings
 Will Malone – string arrangements and conduction
 Meshell Ndegeocello – bass guitar, production, vocals
 Phoebe Killdeer – vocals
 Mandy Senior – backing vocals
 Siouxsie Sioux – vocals
 Nadia Cielto Steele – backing vocals
 Ty – backing vocals
 Cassie Watson – backing vocals
 Gavyn Wright – string conduction
 Jason Anthoney Wright – backing vocals

Technical personnel
 Mike Marsh – mastering
 Sue Amaradivakara – sleeve illustrations

Charts

Weekly charts

Year-end charts

Certifications

References

External links
 
 

Basement Jaxx albums
2003 albums
XL Recordings albums
Grammy Award for Best Dance/Electronica Album